American actor Rami Malek has received 14 awards from 46 nominations. He has won one Academy Award, one British Academy Film Award, and one Screen Actors Guild Award from four nominations. Malek has also received one Golden Globe Award from four nominations and one Primetime Emmy Award.

For his work on Mr. Robot (2015–2019), Malek was nominated for a Primetime Emmy Award, two Critics' Choice Television Awards, two Satellite Awards, three Golden Globe Awards, and four Screen Actors Guild Awards, among others, winning the Primetime Emmy Award for Outstanding Lead Actor in a Drama Series and Critics' Choice Television Award for Best Actor in a Drama Series (both in 2016).

His portrayal of Freddie Mercury in Bohemian Rhapsody (2018) won him the Academy Award for Best Actor, BAFTA Award for Best Actor in a Leading Role, Golden Globe Award for Best Actor – Motion Picture Drama, and Screen Actors Guild Award for Outstanding Performance by a Male Actor in a Leading Role. He was also nominated for the Critics' Choice Movie Award for Best Actor. The film was nominated for the Academy Award for Best Picture and won the Golden Globe Award for Best Motion Picture – Drama, and became a massive box-office success, grossing over $900 million worldwide on a production budget of about $50 million, becoming the sixth-highest-grossing film of 2018 and the highest-grossing musical biographical film of all time, as well as one of 20th Century Fox's top ten highest-grossing films.

Major associations

Academy Awards 
The Academy Awards, also known as "The Oscars", is a set of 24 awards for artistic and technical merit in the film industry, given annually by the Academy of Motion Picture Arts and Sciences (AMPAS), to recognize excellence in cinematic achievements as assessed by the Academy's voting membership. Malek has won once.

British Academy Film Awards 
The British Academy Film Award is an annual award show presented by the British Academy of Film and Television Arts (BAFTA). Malek has won once.

Golden Globe Awards 
The Golden Globe Award is an accolade bestowed by the 93 members of the Hollywood Foreign Press Association (HFPA) recognizing excellence in film and television, both domestic and foreign. Malek has received one award from four nominations.

Primetime Emmy Award 
The Primetime Emmy Award is an American award bestowed by the Academy of Television Arts & Sciences (ATAS) in recognition of excellence in American primetime television programming since 1949. Malek has won once.

Screen Actors Guild Awards 
The Screen Actors Guild Awards (SAG) are organized by the Screen Actors Guild‐American Federation of Television and Radio Artists (SAG-AFTRA). First awarded in 1995, the awards aim to recognize excellent achievements in film and television. Malek has received one award from four nominations.

Other associations

Alliance of Women Film Journalists 
A non-profit organization, the Alliance of Women Film Journalists was founded to support women's work in the film industry in 2006. Malek has been nominated once.

Austin Film Critics Association 
The Austin Film Critics Association, founded by Cole Dabney and Bobby McCurdy in 2005, is an organization of professional film critics. Malek has been nominated once.

Australian Academy of Cinema and Television Arts Awards 
The AACTA Awards, formerly the Australian Film Institute Awards (AFI), are presented annually by the Australian Academy of Cinema and Television Arts (AACTA). Malek has won once.

Chicago Film Critics Association 
The Chicago Film Critics Association was founded by Sharon LeMaire and Sue Kiner in 1990. Malek has been nominated once.

Critics' Choice Awards 
The Critics' Choice Awards have been presented annually by the Broadcast Film Critics Association (BFCA) since 1995 and by the Broadcast Television Journalists Association for outstanding achievements in the film and TV industries since 2011. Malek has received one award from three nominations.

Dallas–Fort Worth Film Critics Association 
The Dallas–Fort Worth Film Critics Association is an organization of radio, television, and internet journalists from Dallas–Fort Worth-based publications. Malek has been nominated once.

Detroit Film Critics Society 
The Detroit Film Critics Society, founded in 2007, is a film critic organization based in Detroit, Michigan. Malek has been nominated once.

Dorian Awards 
The Dorian Awards are presented by the Gay and Lesbian Entertainment Critics Association. Malek has been nominated three times.

Georgia Film Critics Association 
The Georgia Film Critics Association, founded in 2011, is the first film critics group in the state of Georgia. Malek has been nominated once.

Houston Film Critics Society 
The Houston Film Critics Society, founded in 2007, presents an annual set of film awards for "extraordinary accomplishment in film" in a ceremony held at the Museum of Fine Arts, Houston. Malek has been nominated once.

Indiewire Critics Poll 
The IndieWire Critics Poll is an annual poll by IndieWire that recognizes the best in American and international films in a ranking of 10 films on 15 different categories. The winners are chosen by the votes of the critics from Indiewire. Malek has been nominated once.

Los Angeles Online Film Critics Society 
The Los Angeles Online Film Critics Society was founded in 2016 with a purpose is to be a critics group that is diverse and supports underrepresented voices. Malek has won once.

MTV Movie & TV Awards 
The MTV Award (Movie & TV) was founded in 1992, where the nominees are decided by MTV producers and executives, while the winners are decided by the general public. Malek has been nominated once.

Palm Springs International Film Festival 
Founded in 1989 in Palm Springs, California, the Palm Springs International Film Festival is held annually in January. Malek has won once.

People's Choice Awards 
The People's Choice Awards is an American awards show recognizing the people and the work of popular culture. The show has been held annually and is voted on by the general public since 1975. Malek has been nominated once.

San Diego Film Critics Society 
The San Diego Film Critics Society, founded in 1996, is an organization of film reviewers in San Diego. Malek has been nominated once.

San Francisco Bay Area Film Critics Circle 
The San Francisco Bay Area Film Critics Circle, founded in 2002, is an organization of film reviewers in San Francisco, California that award films. Malek has been nominated once.

Santa Barbara International Film Festival 
The Santa Barbara International Film Festival is an eleven day film festival held in Santa Barbara, California since 1986.

Satellite Awards 
The Satellite Awards are a set of annual awards given by the International Press Academy since 1997. Malek has received one award from three nominations.

Seattle Film Critics Society 
The Seattle Film Critics Society, formed in 2016, is a group of film critics and reviewers in Seattle and surrounding areas of Washington state. Members review films in print, radio, television, and online mediums. Malek has been nominated once.

St. Louis Film Critics Association 
The St. Louis Film Critics Association, founded in 2004, is an organization of film critics operating in Greater St. Louis. Malek has been nominated once.

Television Critics Association Awards 
The TCA Awards have been presented by the Television Critics Association in recognition of excellence in television since 1985. Malek has been nominated once.

Washington D.C. Area Film Critics Association 
The Washington D.C. Area Film Critics Association, founded in 2002, is a group of film critics based in Washington, D.C. Malek has been nominated once.

References

External links
 

Malek, Rami